Smith Cove is the name of several coves in the US state of Connecticut.

  in New London County; also known as Alewife Cove, Bolles Cove, Smiths Cove, The Cove. It is connected to the Thames River.
  in Fairfield County; also known as Indian Harbor
  in New London County
 Keeny Cove (sometimes known as Smith Cove)  in New London County

References

Coves of the United States
Estuaries of Connecticut
Bodies of water of New London County, Connecticut
Waterford, Connecticut
Bays of Connecticut